The 1836 Grand Liverpool Steeplechase was the first of three unofficial annual precursors of a steeplechase which later became known as the Grand National.

The steeplechase was held at Aintree Racecourse near Liverpool, England on 29 February 1836 and attracted a field of ten runners.

The winning horse was The Duke, ridden by Captain Martin Becher in the violet with white sleeves and cap colours of Mr Sirdefield, the landlord of the George Inn in Great Crosby and was trained privately. The race was won in a time of 20 minutes 10 seconds, over twice the present course record.

The race was a selling race and its status as an official Grand National was revoked some time between 1862 and 1873.

Finishing order

Non-finishers

The race

Despite this at least three of the runners had to be put at the first fence for a second time after refusing. None of the ten riders are known to have been thrown from their mounts during the first circuit but 'Gulliver and Cowslip came back onto the racecourse some distance behind the other eight runners and in such a distressed state that their riders did not continue onto the second circuit.

The favourite, Laurie Todd was knocked out of the race in unsportsmanlike circumstances when his rider took the horse down a lane alongside the course towards the first brook. This was within the rules of the race and a gate at the end of the lane had in fact been nailed open to facilitate the use of the lane. A spectator took exception to the use of the lane on the first circuit and freed the gate, nailing it shut before the rider returned. The gate proved too high for Laurie Todd to jump and the horse became the first to fall in the race. As Horatio Powell attempted to remount his horse it was alleged that another rider, Bartholomew Bretherton, deliberately steered his horse towards Powell in order to prevent him remounting. The rider of the favourite was knocked back to the ground and forced to retire from the race through injury. He did not however lodge any protest on his return to the weighing room, suggesting that the act was considered part of the game.

Baronet, The Sweep and Derry were all tailed off or out of the race entirely by the time the leaders reached the first brook for the second time and did not complete the race.

Cockahoop and Percy remained in contention until reaching the Canal Turn for the second time after which they were left behind to finish the race in third and fourth place respectively.

The Duke and Polyanthus were the two horses who disputed the finish of the race and came back onto the racecourse together. Both horses made jumping errors at the final hurdle before The Duke prevailed by one length with Polyanthus finishing second.

Aftermath
The race largely failed to capture the public imagination and came in for scathing comments from some of the local press. By the time the first Grand National historians began emerging in the early 1860s this race, and the two which would follow in 1837 and 1838, had largely been forgotten by the passing of time and fading memories. As a result, when the first honours board was erected at Aintree in the early 1890s this race was totally omitted and remained forgotten for over a century before being rediscovered early in the 21st Century. It is still regarded officially by Aintree as not being worthy of Grand National status and is instead regarded as the first of three unofficial precursors over the same course.

References

Grand National
 1836
Grand National
History of Liverpool
February 1836 sports events
1830s in Liverpool